

Werner Kolb (27 July 1895 – 18 February 1975) was a German general during World War II who commanded the 9th Volksgrenadier Division. He was a recipient of the Knight's Cross of the Iron Cross with Oak Leaves of Nazi Germany.

Awards and decorations

 Clasp to the Iron Cross (1939) 2nd Class (16 June 1940) &  1st Class  (4 July 1940)
 German Cross in Gold on 2 January 1942 as Major of the Reserves in the II./Infanterie-Regiment 36
 Knight's Cross of the Iron Cross with Oak Leaves
 Knight's Cross on 27 June 1942 as Major of the Reserves and commander II./Infanterie-Regiment 36
 Oak Leaves on 26 June 1944 as Oberst of the Reserves and commander of Grenadier-Regiment 36

References

Citations

Bibliography

 
 
 

1895 births
1975 deaths
People from Siegen-Wittgenstein
People from the Province of Westphalia
Major generals of the German Army (Wehrmacht)
German Army personnel of World War I
Recipients of the clasp to the Iron Cross, 2nd class
Recipients of the Gold German Cross
Recipients of the Knight's Cross of the Iron Cross with Oak Leaves
German prisoners of war in World War II held by the United States
Military personnel from North Rhine-Westphalia
German Army generals of World War II